Westerly is a census-designated place (CDP) in the town of Westerly in Washington County, Rhode Island, United States.  The population was 17,682 at the 2000 census.

Geography

Demographics

As of the census of 2000, there were 17,682 people, 7,346 households, and 4,657 families residing in the CDP. There were 7,812 housing units at an average density of 489.1/mi2 (188.9/km2). The racial makeup of the CDP was 94.65% White, 0.82% Black or African American, 0.55% Native American, 2.40% Asian, 0.34% from other races, and 1.24% from two or more races. Hispanic or Latino of any race were 1.16% of the population.

There were 7,346 households, out of which 28.7% had children under the age of 18 living with them, 48.4% were married couples living together, 11.1% had a female householder with no husband present, and 36.6% were non-families. 30.6% of all households were made up of individuals, and 13.5% had someone living alone who was 65 years of age or older.  The average household size was 2.36 and the average family size was 2.97.

In the CDP, the population was spread out, with 22.7% under the age of 18, 7.3% from 18 to 24, 29.8% from 25 to 44, 22.3% from 45 to 64, and 17.9% who were 65 years of age or older.  The median age was 39 years. For every 100 females, there were 92.3 males.  For every 100 females age 18 and over, there were 88.3 males.

The median income for a household in the CDP was $42,860, and the median income for a family was $53,130. Males had a median income of $37,213 versus $26,096 for females. The per capita income for the CDP was $23,180.  About 4.3% of families and 6.8% of the population were below the poverty line, including 9.2% of those under age 18 and 7.8% of those age 65 or over.

References

Census-designated places in Washington County, Rhode Island
Providence metropolitan area
Census-designated places in Rhode Island